This article lists the colonial governors of Italian Cyrenaica from 1912 to 1935. They administered the territory on behalf of the Kingdom of Italy.

List
Complete list of colonial governors of Italian Cyrenaica:

For continuation after unification, see: List of governors-general of Italian Libya

See also
Ottoman Tripolitania
Pasha of Tripoli
Italian Libya
List of governors-general of Italian Libya
Italian Tripolitania
List of colonial governors of Italian Tripolitania
Italian Cyrenaica

Footnotes

References

Cyrenaica
Libya history-related lists
Italian Empire-related lists
Governors
Rulers of Cyrenaica